These are the final results for the tennis competition at the 1992 Summer Olympics in Barcelona, Spain.

American teenager Jennifer Capriati stunned German (and defending champion) Steffi Graf in the women's singles final to win the gold medal. Marc Rosset became the first Swiss Olympic tennis gold medallist.

The matches were played on outdoor clay courts at the Tennis de la Vall d'Hebron.

Medal summary

Medal table

Events

References
Official Olympic Report

 
1992
1992 Summer Olympics events
Olympics
Olympics
1992 Summer Olympics
Oly
Oly